Mikhail Leonidovich Timonov (born 22 May 1965 in Moscow, USSR) is a Russian politician. Member of the Moscow City Duma, leader of the Opposition.

Biography
Born on September 22 May 1965 in Moscow, RSFSR. Graduated from the Moscow Aviation Institute.

2019 Moscow City Duma election

Mikhail won the elections to the Moscow City Duma of the seventh convocation in the 16th single-mandate constituency (the districts Bogorodskoye, Preobrazhenskoye, part of Sokolinaya Gora), receiving 12.293 votes (37.6%). Member of the commissions for urban planning, state property and land use, environmental policy, urban management and housing policy.

He was supported by Alexey Navalny's "Smart Voting" system. From September to November 2019 Michail Timonov led A Just Russia in Moscow City Duma and was suspended due to vote against the draft budget of Moscow for 2020.

Electoral history

Moscow City Duma elections

2014

2019

References

Living people
1965 births
21st-century Russian politicians
Deputies of Moscow City Duma
A Just Russia politicians
Russian Presidential Academy of National Economy and Public Administration alumni

Timonov aacupaide the local area group on Facebood and delayed all critics or opponents.